Daniela Stumpf (born 13 September 1965) is a German former footballer who played as a defender. She made six appearances for the Germany national team from 1987 to 1992.

References

External links
 

1965 births
Living people
German women's footballers
Women's association football defenders
Germany women's international footballers
Place of birth missing (living people)